Rowland Depot is a historic train station located at Rowland, Robeson County, North Carolina.  It was built in 1925 by the Atlantic Coast Line Railroad.  It is a one-story, "L"-plan, hip roofed brick structure in the Bungalow / American Craftsman style.  It rests on a poured concrete foundation and the roof has wide, sheltering overhangs on the hipped main block and the gable end freight wing supported by Craftsman style triangular wooden brackets.

It was added to the National Register of Historic Places in 2001.

References

Railway stations on the National Register of Historic Places in North Carolina
Railway stations in the United States opened in 1925
Transportation in Robeson County, North Carolina
National Register of Historic Places in Robeson County, North Carolina
Former Atlantic Coast Line Railroad stations
Bungalow architecture in North Carolina